Duerden may refer to:
 Brian I. Duerden (born 1948), an English bacteriologist
 Dave Duerden (born 1977), a former Canadian ice hockey player
 Ian Duerden (born 1978), an English former professional football player
 James Duerden, an English professional football player
 James Edwin Duerden, a British zoologist
 Paul Duerden (born 1974), a Canadian volleyball player
 Peter Duerden (born 1945), a retired English-Canadian football defender
 Susan Duerden, a British actress whose roles include the character "Carole Littleton" in the television series "Lost"
 Thomas Lucas Duerden (1898–1969), an English cathedral organist

See also
 Dearden